VOT may refer to:

 Value of time, the opportunity cost of time expended in some activity
 Voice Of Tranquility, a female fronted rock and metal band from the Philippines
 Vampire on Titus, an album by  Dayton Indie rock band Guided by Voices
 VHF omnidirectional range
 Video on Trial, a television show by MuchMusic
 Voice onset time
 Votic language